Leslie James "Les" Clark (November 17, 1907 - September 12, 1979) was an American animator and the first of Disney's Nine Old Men. Joining Disney in 1927, he was the only one to work on the origins of Mickey Mouse with Ub Iwerks.

Early life 
Les Clark was born in Ogden, Utah in 1907, the eldest of 12 children to James Clark, a carpenter, and Lute Wadsworth. By 1910, the family lived in Salt Lake City and by 1920, they lived in Twin Falls, Idaho. By 1930, they lived in Los Angeles, where Les attended Venice High School. During high school, he worked a summer job at an ice cream shop near Walt Disney Studios in Hollywood. Walt and Roy Disney were frequent patrons at the shop, and Walt had once complimented Les on his lettering job of the menus. Eventually, Les got the courage to ask Walt for a job. He recalled Walt's reply: 

...[Walt said] 'Bring some of your drawings in and let's see what they look like.' So, I copied some cartoons and showed them to Walt. He said I had a good line, and why don't I come to work on Monday.

Les reported to the studio the Monday after he graduated high school for a temporary position in 1927.

He and his wife Miriam had a son, Richard, and a daughter, Miriam.

Career at Disney Studio 
Les started work at the studio first as a camera operator and doing ink and paint on the animations. He moved on to work under the guidance of Ub Iwerks. During the development of the character Mickey Mouse, Clark was promoted to the position of inbetweener where he worked on a scene for the upcoming Steamboat Willie. Les was then promoted to animator and was tasked to work on the Silly Symphony The Skeleton Dance. After 
Ub Iwerks left Disney, Clark was given the position as lead animator on Mickey Mouse. He continued honing his craft, attending art classes while working at the studio. As he improved, he was given the task of animating the Seven Dwarfs in the upcoming film Snow White and the Seven Dwarfs. In particular, Clark worked on the scene where Snow White dances with each of the Seven Dwarfs. He would go on to animate the iconic Disney characters Pinocchio, Cinderella, Alice and Tinker Bell.

Animation style 
Clark was known for his skill in timing his animation to musical scores, as well as his ability to convey emotion in his work.

Death 
Les Clark died of cancer in Santa Barbara, California on September 12, 1979.

Filmography

References 

Canemaker, John. (2001). Walt Disney's Nine Old Men and the Art of Animation. New York, NY: Disney Editions.

External links 
 
 

1907 births
1979 deaths
Animators from Utah
Animators from California
American animated film directors
Burials in Tennessee
Film directors from Utah
Deaths from cancer in California
Walt Disney Animation Studios people
Venice High School (Los Angeles) alumni